Nacho Galindo may refer to:

Nacho Galindo (actor) (1908–1973), Mexican-American actor
Nacho Galindo (singer) (born 1959), Mexican singer and bassist

See also
Ignacio Galindo (disambiguation)